Bayot is a language of southern Senegal, southwest of Ziguinchor in a group of villages near Nyassia, and in northwestern Guinea-Bissau, along the Senegalese border, and in the Gambia.

The Kugere and Kuxinge (Essin) dialects of Senegal and the Arame (Edamme) and Gubaare dialects of Guinea-Bissau are distinct enough to be sometimes considered different languages.

Bayot is the most divergent of the Jola languages, in the Senegambian branch of the Niger–Congo language family.

References

External links 
 ELAR archive of Documenting the Bayot language

Unclassified languages of Africa
Languages of Guinea-Bissau
Languages of Senegal
Jola languages